Mad Max is an Australian media franchise.

Mad Max may also refer to:

Films 
Mad Max (film), released in 1979
Mad Max 2, released in 1981
Mad Max Beyond Thunderdome, released in 1985
Mad Max: Fury Road, released in 2015

Related topics 
Mad Max (soundtrack), the soundtrack for the first film
Mad Max (1990 video game), NES game based on Mad Max 2
Mad Max (2015 video game), based on the franchise
Mad Max series legacy and influence in popular culture
Max Rockatansky, the main protagonist of the film series

People
 Jochen Hippel (born 1971), German musician 
 Vernon Maxwell (born 1965), former NBA player
 Max Papis (born 1969), Italian race car driver
 Max Biaggi (born 1971), Italian motorcycle racer
 Aravinda de Silva (born 1965), Sri Lankan former cricketer
 Max Scherzer, American baseball pitcher
 Maxwell R. Thurman (1931–1995), American general
 Maxime Bernier, nicknamed Mad Max, a Canadian politician
 Max Tegmark, nicknamed Mad Max, a physicist
 Max Verstappen (born 1997), Dutch race car driver

Other uses
 Mad Max (band), a German hard rock band

See also

 
 
 
 Mad Maxine, a journalist and former professional wrestler
 MAD (disambiguation)
 Max (disambiguation)